Yuryung-Khaya (Ürüŋ xaya) is a rural locality (a selo), the only inhabited locality, and the administrative center of Yuryung-Khainsky National (Dolgan) Rural Okrug of Anabarsky District in the Sakha Republic, Russia, located  from Saskylakh, the administrative center of the district. Its population as of the 2010 Census was 1,148, of whom 552 were male and 596 female, up from 1,051 recorded during the 2002 Census.

Geography
The village is situated on the right bank of the Anabar River, shortly before it flows into the Laptev Sea.

History and demographics
The village was founded in 1930 as part of Soviet efforts to settle the nomadic indigenous inhabitants of the region.  The village's name means White Mountain in the Yakut and Dolgan languages.

Yuryung-Khaya is the only settlement in the Sakha Republic with a population composed mainly of Dolgans, and also the only substantial population of Dolgans outside the Krasnoyarsk Kray.

Economy and infrastructure
The village economy is based around agriculture, specifically reindeer herding, fishing and other farming.  It is reachable via a winter road leading upstream along the Anabar to Saskylakh.

Climate
Owing to the extreme northern location Yuryung-Khaya has a cold and dry polar climate (Köppen ET) with severely cold winters and cool summers.

References

Notes

Sources
Official website of the Sakha Republic. Registry of the Administrative-Territorial Divisions of the Sakha Republic. Anabarsky District. 

Rural localities in the Sakha Republic
Road-inaccessible communities of the Sakha Republic